Lokve is a Croatian municipality of Primorje–Gorski Kotar County. With an area of 42 km2, it has a population of 1,049.

The municipality is located in the mountainous region of Gorski kotar. The Lokvarsko Lake is located between the settlements of Homer and Mrzla Vodica.

The settlements in the municipality are:
 Homer, population 272
 Lazac Lokvarski, population 18
 Lokve, population 584
 Mrzla Vodica, population 16
 Sleme, population 104
 Sopač, population 39
 Zelin Mrzlovodički, population 16
 
The 1st Underwater Orienteering World Championships was held in Lokve in 1973.

References

External links
Touristic site of Lokve
Coat of arms of Lokve (on hr.wp)

Municipalities of Croatia
Populated places in Primorje-Gorski Kotar County